Stopsley is a suburb in the north-east of Luton, in the Luton district, in the ceremonial county of Bedfordshire, England. The area is roughly bounded by the edge of Luton to the north, Vauxhall Way and Turners Road North to the south, Bradgers Hill to the west, and Cannon Lane, Stapleford Road and Brays Road to the east.

Etymology

Frederick Davis, writing in 1965 believed the name of Stospley to come from Scrobbale, (in Saxon;) Scrapes or Scroppeslie, (in Norman;) Shrubsley, (in English.;) meaning a hill covered with scrobbes (shrubs or underwood.) Most modern etymologists consider the name to be made up of two elements 'Stopp' and 'ley'. dating between AD 750 and AD 950.  The ending comes from the Old English 'leah' meaning a wood or clearing in a wood. 'Stopp' was a personal name and indicated ownership of the wood or clearing.
It appears as 'Stopeslegh in Soca de Luton' in a (Latin) law record, dated 1440.

Originally a hill-top village settlement, on 1 April 1896 it became a civil parish, formed from part of the parish of Luton Rural, on 1 April 1933 most of the urbanised part of the parish of Stopsley became part of Luton when the boundaries were extended, with the rural areas going to Hyde and Streatley with Sharpenhoe. In 1931 the parish had a population of 1474.

Local area

The centre of Stopsley is made up of a variety of shops around a village church. From a distance the skyline is dominated by Jansel House, an office block built in 1961 which houses the Luton VAT office over a parade of shops at street level. One of Luton's two cemeteries, The Vale, is located nearby on the Hitchin Road.

Politics

Stopsley is part of the larger Stopsley ward which also includes Putteridge and part of Ramridge End. The ward is represented by Cllr David Wynn (Liberal Democrats) and Cllr Richard Underwood (Liberal Democrats).
The ward forms part of the parliamentary constituency of Luton South and the MP is Rachel Hopkins (Labour Party).

Local attractions

Education

Stopsley includes the specialist Sports College, Stopsley High School. Notable alumni include professional cricketer Monty Panesar.
In the 1960s, Stopsley Infant and Junior School pupils included Alec Jeffreys, who went on to discover the DNA genetic fingerprint. He is now Professor of Genetics at Leicester University and was Knighted in 1994. Another pupil, David Renwick, created the television series 'One Foot in the Grave' and 'Jonathan Creek'. Both went on to study at Luton Grammar School and Luton Sixth Form College.

Gallery

References

Further reading

James Dyer, The Stopsley Book, Book Castle, 2nd Edn. 2005, .
James Dyer, The Stopsley Picture Book, Book Castle. 2002, .
Keith T. Norcott, Chalk on my Shoes, Book Castle, 2006, 

Wards of Luton
Areas of Luton
Former civil parishes in Bedfordshire